Camisano  may refer to:

Camisano, Lombardy, a comune in the Province of Cremona, Italy
Camisano Vicentino, a comune in the Province of Vicenza, Italy

it:Camisano